All the Things I Never Said may refer to:

All the Things I Never Said (Pale Waves EP)
All the Things I Never Said (Tate McRae EP)